Radio Retaliation is the fifth studio album by American electronic music duo Thievery Corporation, released on September 23, 2008 by ESL Music. Intended to be a political album, it was recorded in the band's hometown of Washington, D.C. from April 2007 to August 2008.

A pre-release of the album was released on iTunes on September 9, 2008, featuring an exclusive track entitled "Philosopher’s Stone". The band also promoted the album through Facebook and iLike. The music video for "The Numbers Game" single debuted on December 15.

The album was nominated for a Grammy Award in the category Best Recording Package. The album cover shows a photograph of the Mexican rebel Subcomandante Marcos.

Track listing
 "Sound the Alarm" (featuring Sleepy Wonder) – 3:41
 "Mandala" (featuring Anoushka Shankar on sitar) - 4:00
 "Radio Retaliation" (featuring Sleepy Wonder) – 3:26
 "Vampires" (featuring Femi Kuti) – 4:57
 "Hare Krisna" (featuring Seu Jorge) – 3:35
 "El Pueblo Unido" (featuring Verny Varela) – 3:29
 "(The Forgotten People)" – 3:10
 "33 Degree" (featuring Zee) – 3:47
 "Beautiful Drug" (featuring Jana Andevska) – 3:27
 "La Femme Parallel" (featuring LouLou Ghelichkhani) – 4:29
 "Retaliation Suite" – 2:53
 "The Numbers Game" (featuring Chuck Brown) – 3:03
 "The Shining Path" – 3:38
 "Blasting Through the City" (featuring Notch) – 3:33
 "Sweet Tides" (featuring LouLou Ghelichkhani) – 4:48

iTunes bonus tracks
 "Philosopher's Stone" – 4:10 
 "Vampires" (Louis Vega House Remix) – 9:42 
 "Vampires" (Louie Vega Dub Remix) – 9:42 
 "Mandala" (Pathaan Remix) – 5:37

Charts

Weekly charts

Year-end charts

References

2008 albums
Thievery Corporation albums